David Ellis (born 23 June 1939) is an English academic and writer. He went from a local grammar school to study English at Downing College, Cambridge under F. R. Leavis and then spent three years teaching at La Trobe University in Melbourne, Australia.  The rest of his academic career was at the University of Kent in Canterbury, apart from two years as a visiting professor in two separate universities in the United States and another as an Andrew Mellon Fellow at the National Humanities Center in North Carolina.  In 1998 he took early retirement in order to write more and has since published over a dozen books. He remains an Emeritus Professor at the University of Kent. Married with two daughters and three grandchildren he lives in Faversham, Kent.

Key publications 

Ellis’s first publications were a translation of Stendhal’s Memoirs of an Egotist and a book on Wordsworth's Prelude.  He was then responsible for the third volume of the new Cambridge biography of D. H. Lawrence (Dying Game)  which was short-listed for the James Tait Black award.

A good deal of his work since his retirement has been on D.H.Lawrence and includes Death and the Author: How D. H. Lawrence died, and was remembered (2008)  as well as Love and Sex in D. H. Lawrence (2015).  In a review of Death and the Author, Peter Balbert of Trinity University wrote 
" LET ME BE PRECISE and unequivocal here. David Ellis, the distinguished critic and the author of the third and final volume of the Cambridge life of D.H.Lawrence, now has written nothing less than a masterpiece of biography, intellectual history, and medical inquiry in a study that is simultaneously wide-ranging and sharply focused. " In 2011 Ellis was awarded the Harry T. Moore award  for services to Lawrence studies.

Writing biography turned Ellis’s attention to its problems, some of which he addressed in Literary Lives: Biography and the search for understanding (2000).  Struck with how many biographies of Shakespeare could appear when so little is known about his private life, he discussed the issues in both That Man Shakespeare (2005) and The Truth about William Shakespeare (2015) although in between he also wrote Shakespeare’s Practical Jokes: an introduction to the comic in his work (2007).  Ellis is the author of two memoirs, Memoirs of a Leavisite: The decline and fall of Cambridge English (2013) and Frank Cioffi: the philosopher in shirt-sleeves (2015) and has kept up his interest in Romantic writers with Byron in Geneva: That summer of 1816 (2011) and, most recently, The Story of Stendhal and British Culture (2018).

Ellis has also written introductions for Wordsworth Classics, Penguin Classics and Everyman's Library.

Books 
Perfidious Albion: The Story of Stendhal and British Culture (2018), Edward Everett Root Publishers .
Love and Sex in D. H. Lawrence (2015), Clemson University Press .
Frank Cioffi: The philosopher in shirt-sleeves (2015), Bloomsbury .
Memoirs of a Leavisite: The decline and fall of 'Cambridge English''' (2013), Liverpool University Press . Long-listed for the J. R. Ackerley prize for autobiography.The truth about William Shakespeare (2012), Edinburgh University Press, .Byron in Geneva: That Summer of 1816 (2011), Liverpool University Press .Death and the Author: How D. H. Lawrence died, and was remembered (2008), Oxford University Press .Shakespeare's Practical Jokes: an introduction to the comic in his work (2007), Associated University Presses .That Man Shakespeare (2005), Helm Information .Literary Lives: Biography and the Search for Understanding (2000), Edinburgh University Press .D. H. Lawrence: Dying Game'' (1998),Cambridge University Press . Short-listed for the James Tait Black Memorial Prize.

References 

1939 births
Living people
People from Swinton, Greater Manchester
20th-century British male writers
20th-century British writers
Alumni of Downing College, Cambridge
Academics of the University of Kent
Academic staff of La Trobe University
21st-century British male writers